Oro County was a county of the United States Territory of Kansas that existed from February 7, 1859 to January 29, 1861, when Kansas joined the Union as a state.

History
In July 1858, gold was discovered along the South Platte River in Arapahoe County of the Territory of Kansas (now in the State of Colorado). This discovery precipitating the Pike's Peak Gold Rush. To provide local government for the gold mining region, the Kansas Territorial Legislature split Arapahoe County into six counties on February 7, 1859: a much smaller Arapahoe County, Broderick County, El Paso County, Fremont County, Montana County, and Oro County. Oro County was named for the Spanish language name for gold, despite the fact that the county lay to the east of the gold mining region.  None of these six counties were ever organized.  Many residents of the mining region felt disconnected from the territorial government, and they formed their own Territory of Jefferson on October 24, 1859.

Following the Republican Party election victories in 1860, the United States Congress admitted Kansas to the Union.  The Kansas Act of Admission excluded the portion of the Kansas Territory west of the 25th meridian west from Washington from the new state, and Oro County and the rest of this region reverted to unorganized territory.

On February 28, 1861, the Territory of Colorado was organized to govern this unorganized territory and adjacent areas of the Territory of New Mexico, the Territory of Utah, and the Territory of Nebraska. The new Colorado General Assembly organized 17 counties on November 1, 1861.

See also
Historic Colorado counties
History of Colorado
History of Kansas
Pike's Peak Gold Rush
Territory of Colorado
Territory of Jefferson
Territory of Kansas

References

External links
Colorado County Evolution by Don Stanwyck
Kansas State Historical Society website
Colorado State Historical Society website

Former counties of the United States
1859 establishments in Kansas Territory
Populated places established in 1859
Populated places disestablished in 1861